Sharipovo (Şärip) is a rural locality (a village) in Khamitovsky Selsoviet, Abzelilovsky District, Bashkortostan, Russia. The population was 241 as of 2010. There are 6 streets.

Geography 
Sharipovo is located 64 km northwest of Askarovo (the district's administrative centre) by road. Maygashta is the nearest rural locality.

References 

Rural localities in Abzelilovsky District